Cuthbert John Skead, also known as "C. J. Skead", "Jack Skead" or "Skeado" (30 April 1912 – 28 May 2006), was a South African ornithologist, historian and botanist.

Early life
Born in Port Elizabeth, 30 April 1912, Skead initially attended Grey High School in Port Elizabeth, before completing his schooling at St Andrew's College in Grahamstown. His tertiary education was undertaken at Reading University in the United Kingdom, and Grootfontein Agricultural College back in South Africa.

For the next 17 years after completing his tertiary education, Skead farmed in the Grahamstown district. It was during his farming career that he started observing birds in the vicinity which led to his first publication appearing in the journal Ostrich (journal) in 1943. In 1949, Skead took up the position of Director at the Kaffrarian Museum (now the Amathole Museum). He also served as a research officer for the Percy FitzPatrick Institute, a research institute associated with the University of Cape Town from 1961 to 1966, after which he returned to the museum where he remained until his retirement in 1972.

Legacy
Skead contributed to the scholarly knowledge through producing more than 100 journal articles and books, including Sunbirds of South Africa, Canaries, seedeaters and buntings, and Historical Incidence of the Larger Mammals.

Honours
 1966 Gill Memorial Medal from the Southern African Ornithological Society
 1977 Gold Medal from the Zoological Society of Southern Africa
 1982 Honorary Doctorate from Rhodes University
 2002 Gold Medal from the Grassland Society
 2004 Honorary Doctorate from the University of Port Elizabeth
 2005 Special Award from the Eastern Cape Government

References

External links
 C. J. Skead Photograph collection
 Selmar Schonland Herbarium - CJ Skead Collection
 Margaret Sandwith (2007) Publications by CJ Skead, Ostrich: Journal of African Ornithology, 78:3, vii-x

1912 births
2006 deaths
People from Port Elizabeth
White South African people
South African ornithologists
Alumni of the University of Reading
20th-century South African zoologists